Aristolochia utriformis is a species of plant in the family Aristolochiaceae. It is endemic to China. It is found in forests at about 1900 meters in Yunnan Province. The plants are climbing herbs or shrubs that have pointed leaves with heart shaped bases. The yellow-green flowers  are tube shaped and bent. They hang from the base of a leaf.

References

Flora of China
utriformis
Critically endangered plants
Taxonomy articles created by Polbot